Gallifet or Galiffet may refer to:

People with the surname
François de Galiffet de Caffin (1666 – 1746), French military officer.
Gaston Alexandre Auguste, Marquis de Galliffet, Prince de Martigues (1830–1909), French general.
Joseph de Gallifet (1663–1749), French Jesuit priest.
Joseph d'Honon de Gallifet (d. 1706), French colonial administrator.

Other
Hôtel de Galliffet, a townhouse in Paris, France.
Gallifet trousers, riding breeches-style trousers of Soviet military uniform